Two former railroad stations are listed on the National Register of Historic Places as Minneapolis, St. Paul and Sault Ste. Marie Depot:

 Moose Lake station
 Thief River Falls station

See also 
 Minneapolis, St. Paul and Sault Ste. Marie Railroad
 Soo Line Depot (disambiguation)